Atuna cordata is a tree in the Atuna genus of the family Chrysobalanaceae. The specific epithet  is from the Latin meaning "heart-shaped", referring to the leaf base.

Description
The smooth bark is grey-green with white mottles.

Distribution and habitat
Atuna cordata is endemic to Borneo where it is confined to Sabah. Its habitat is on ultramafic soils from sea-level to  altitude.

References

cordata
Endemic flora of Borneo
Flora of Sabah
Plants described in 1987
Taxonomy articles created by Polbot